is a town located in Yamagata Prefecture, Japan. , the town had an estimated population of 14,967 in 5052 households, and a population density of 90 persons per km².

Geography
Kawanishi is located in the southwest of the Yonezawa Basin. There are two major rivers, the Mogami River and the Omonogawa River, running along the town's borders. The literal meaning of Kawanishi is "west of the river", which refers to its location west of the Mogami River. Also, there are two minor rivers, the Inukawa and the Kurokawa, running through the town.

Neighboring municipalities
Yamagata Prefecture
Nagai
Nan'yō
Takahata
Yonezawa
Iide

Climate
Kawanishi has a Humid continental climate (Köppen climate classification Cfa) with large seasonal temperature differences, with warm to hot (and often humid) summers and cold (sometimes severely cold) winters. Precipitation is significant throughout the year, but is heaviest from August to October. The average annual temperature in Kawanishi  is 11.2 °C. The average annual rainfall is 1555 mm with September as the wettest month. The temperatures are highest on average in August, at around 25.0 °C, and lowest in January, at around -1.5 °C.

Demographics
Per Japanese census data, the population of Kawanishi peaked around the year 1950 and has declined steadily since then. It is now considerably less than it was a hundred years ago.

History
The area of present-day Kawanishi was part of ancient Dewa Province. After the start of the Meiji period, the area became part of Higashiokitama District, Yamagata Prefecture. 
The nineteenth-century English traveler, Isabella Bird, stayed in the town, and noted the Yonezawa Basin area "as a 'Garden of Eden,' ground that smiles fruitfully, and Arcadia in Asia."
The town of Kawanishi was established on January 1, 1955 by the merger of the villages of Otsuka, Inukawa, Komatsu and Chugun from Meiji period, the area became part of Higashiokitama District and the village of Tamaniwa from Minamiokitama District. The village of Yoshijima from Higashiokitama District joined the town on February 1, 1955.

Economy
The abundance of water makes the town ideal for farming, mostly rice. The town also produces the famous Yonezawa beef since the Meiji era.

Education
Kawanishi has six public elementary schools and one public middle school operated by the town government, and one public high school operated by the Yamagata Prefectural Board of Education.

Transportation

Railway
 East Japan Railway Company - Yonesaka Line
  -  - 
 Yamagata Railway - Flower Nagai Line

Highway

Local attractions
Kawanishi Dahlia Park

Noted People from Kawanishi
Hisashi Inoue, playwright and writer of comic fiction.

Film Locations
 Warabi no kō (2003)
 Swing Girls (2004)- The competition scene filmed particularly at the town's library and Theater complex called Kawanishi-machi Friendly Plaza.

References

External links
 
Official Website 
Official Kawanishi Tourism website 

 
Towns in Yamagata Prefecture